Cady McClain (born Katie Jo McClain; October 13, 1969) is an American actress, singer, and author.

Career
McClain's professional acting career began in 1978 at the age of 9, when she was featured in a commercial for Band-Aid bandages. 

Among her notable early TV credits was a recurring role on St. Elsewhere, and an appearance on Cheers, when she was 16 years old, as Coach's niece Joyce.

Other TV credits were as Virginia in Emmy Award-winning TV movie Who Will Love My Children, opposite Ann-Margret, Robert Kennedy and His Times, as young Pat Kennedy (with River Phoenix and Chad Lowe), the ABC After School Special Just a Regular Kid: An AIDS story (with Christian Hoff and Dana Ashbrook), Danny Thomas' One Big Family (with Michael DeLuise), Spenser for Hire, (with Robert Urich and Ron LcLarty), Lou Grant, (with Ed Asner) the TV movie Home Fires (with Guy Boyd and Juliette Lewis) and the Michael McKean TV Movie, Town and Gown.

Film
Her first film was in 1982 starring opposite Peter O'Toole in My Favorite Year as Tess, his daughter. She then appeared as a dancer in the Herbert Ross film, Pennies from Heaven starring Steve Martin and Bernadette Peters.

McClain later appeared in the independent films Simple Justice, (1989) with Doris Roberts and Cesar Romero, Alma Mater (2008) with Alexander Chaplin and Will Lyman, Retreat (2004) with Michael E. Knight, and Soldier's Heart, (2008).

Soldier's Heart, a film about veterans and PTSD (with James Kiberd, directed by Brian Delate), won the prestigious Best Narrative Feature award at the GI Film Festival in Washington D.C.

In 2008, McClain also appeared in Home Movie with Adrian Pasdar. In the film, McClain plays Claire Poe, a psychiatrist, mother and wife. Home Movie, is the story of a family's descent into darkness. In a Blair Witch style mockumentary, we follow the Poe children's violent tendencies and their parents' effort to help them. Directed by Chris Denham, it won the Sitgis Film Festival Citizen Cane Award for Best Direction.

Theatre
McClain began working in the theater at a very young age. Her first professional production was as a chorus girl in The Music Man and Finian's Rainbow at Fullerton College. Other small California productions followed such as Wait Until Dark and Dames at Sea. She was cast in a workshop production of the then titled 40 starring Bonnie Franklin, and was brought to New York with the production as part of a pre-Broadway tryout at the John Drew Theater in East Hampton. With lyrics by Judith Viorst, the production title was changed to Happy Birthday and Other Humiliations. She went on to work with Mary Beth Piel and Ron Rains in A Little Night Music at the New York Opera Ensemble, Quiet on the Set at the Westbeth Theater, as Hero in Much Ado About Nothing at the Lincoln Center Stages, Comedy of Errors at the Hudson Theatre Guild, Barefoot in the Park at the Westbury Music Fair, Self Offense with the Cucaracha Theatre Company, Inventions of Farewell at HERE Theatre (a one-woman show directed by Estep Nagy), and The Red Address as Lady, written by David Ives.

She also wrote, produced and acted in a one-woman piece of performance art called Mona 7, which dealt with abuse and its effect on a young woman.

Daytime television

McClain won Emmys for three of her four roles - spanning all three networks over three decades.

Writing
In 2006, maintained a blog on the ABC website titled "Confessions of a Mad Soap Star," which earned over 2 million hits. 

She is a painter, writes poetry and articles for the internet (Policymic.com, HLNTV.com, Parade.com), and plays guitar. Her website, www.cadymcclain.com, displays artwork and collages she has created as well as links to her articles. She released two books of her poetry and art in 2008, Conversations with the Invisible, and Licked.

In 2006, she released an album, Blue Glitter Fish.

In 2010, she released a live album of her music, Club Passim, recorded at Club Passim in Cambridge, Massachusetts.

Personal life

McClain was born in Burbank, California, and was raised in Laguna Niguel, Newport Beach, Irvine and Los Angeles. She attended high school at Corona del Mar High in Newport Beach, University High School in Irvine and Hoover High School in Glendale, California.

McClain moved to New York City when she was seventeen. She lived there for twenty-five years before moving back to Los Angeles in 2012.

McClain married Jon Lindstrom on February 14, 2014.

Filmography

Awards and nominations

See also
 Tad Martin and Dixie Cooney
 Supercouple

References

External links
 
 McClain's All My Children blog
 

1969 births
Living people
20th-century American actresses
21st-century American actresses
American child actresses
American film actresses
American soap opera actresses
American television actresses
Actresses from Burbank, California
Daytime Emmy Award winners
Daytime Emmy Award for Outstanding Supporting Actress in a Drama Series winners
Daytime Emmy Award for Outstanding Younger Actress in a Drama Series winners
Daytime Emmy Award for Outstanding Guest Performer in a Drama Series winners
Musicians from Burbank, California